Eileen Montesin (born October 1, 1962) is a Maltese actress and television personality who appeared on One's programme Undercover, TVM's Dejjem Tiegħek Becky and KC . She has also written and starred in the television series Déjà Vu, which aired on Net TV. She is currently starring in a spinoff of Dejjem Tieghek Becky titled simply Becky, currently in its 5th season. In 2016 a spin-off of Becky was created entitled It's Morris on NET TV with Montesin starring in the same role. Montesin is also a Radio host on Solid Malta 100.2.

Personal life 

On 10 August 2013, Eileen married her long-time partner, Mark Haber. They had been together for 30 years. The couple share a daughter, Christine. They also have a granddaughter, Nina.

Filmography

References

Living people
Maltese television actresses
Maltese television presenters
Place of birth missing (living people)
Maltese women television presenters
1962 births